Pino D'Angiò (born Giuseppe Chierchia, August 14, 1952 in Pompeii) is an Italo disco artist. He is best known for his hit 1980 song, "Ma Quale Idea", which sold over 2 million copies in Europe. The bassline of the track was taken from "Ain't No Stoppin' Us Now" by McFadden & Whitehead, and later sampled in Madison Avenue's 1999 hit "Don't Call Me Baby". Under the name Age of Love, he and producer Bruno Sanchioni released an eponymous track in 1990 which featured vocals by French dancer Valérie Honoré. The vocal is often misattributed to Dutch supermodel Karen Mulder.

Discography

Albums
1981 - ...Balla! (Ri-Fi) (LP)
1982 - Ti regalo della musica (Ri-Fi) (LP)
1983 - Una notte maledetta (SGM) (LP)
1986 - Sunshine Blue (SGM Records) (LP)
1988 - Gente sì & gente no (Carosello) (LP)
1989 - Dancing in Jazz (Carosello) (LP)
1991 - STS - Siamo tutti stufi (Carosello, CLN 25151) (LP)
1997 - Notte d'amore (Pull, 484059-2) (as "Pino D'Angiò & Powerfunk") (CD)
1999 - I successi (D.V. More Record, CD DV 6340) (CD)
1999 - Ma quale idea? e le altre storie (Carosello) (CD)
2002 - Lettere a Federico Fellini (Zetazero) (CD)
2010 - The Only One (Noise & Dreams) (CD)

Singles
1979 - È libero, scusi?/La bottega di Mefistole (Ri-Fi) (7")
1980 - Ma quale idea/Lezione d'amore (Ri-Fi) (7")
1981 - Un concerto da strapazzo (Scusate sono impazzito)/Me ne frego di te (Disco Charleston) (Ri-Fi) (7")
1981 - Okay okay/Una notte da impazzire + Mannaggia rock and roll (OUT) (12" promo)
1982 - Fammi un panino/Questo amore è un motore 
1983 - Evelonpappà evelonmammà/Mani in alto (SGM Records) (7")
1983 - Una notte maledetta/I tabaccai (SGM Records) (7")
1987 - Più sexy/Alquanto arrabbiati (Carosello) (as "Pino D'Angiò & tutti gli altri...") (7", 12")
1989 - Bella margherita/Gente intelligente (Carosello) (7")
1990 - The Age of Love (Diki Records) G. Chierchia/B. Sanchioni - Vocals: Karen Mulder
1991 - Gli sgarbi si pagano/L'inverno (Carosello) (7")
2019 - La Lampada

References

External links
 Website
 Discography
 
 Profile at last.fm

Living people
Italian Italo disco musicians
Italian singers
1952 births
People from Pompei